The following is a list of musical works by the English composer Arthur Sullivan, best known for his operatic collaborations with W. S. Gilbert. In all, Sullivan's artistic output included 23 operas, 13 major orchestral works, eight choral works and oratorios, two ballets, one song cycle, incidental music to several plays, numerous hymns and other church pieces, and a large body of songs, parlour ballads, part songs, carols, and piano and chamber pieces.

Sullivan began to compose music at an early age.  His first known composition, By the Waters of Babylon, dates from when he was eight years old. While a member of the prestigious boys' choir of the Chapel Royal, with the support of the choirmaster, Thomas Helmore, Sullivan composed several more anthems, and one of these, O, Israel, was Sullivan's first published composition, in 1855. Sullivan attended the Royal Academy of Music from 1856 to 1858 and the Leipzig Conservatoire in Germany from 1858 to 1861. As his graduation piece, Sullivan composed a set of incidental music to Shakespeare's The Tempest. Revised and expanded, it was performed at the Crystal Palace in 1862 and was an immediate sensation. He began building a reputation as England's most promising young composer.

Sullivan continued to compose throughout his life.  At his death at age 58, he left unfinished a comic opera, The Emerald Isle, completed by Edward German and produced in 1901, and his Te Deum Laudamus, written to commemorate the end of the Second Boer War, which was performed posthumously.

Theatre music

Operas

 The Sapphire  Necklace (ca. 1863; unperformed)
 Cox and Box (1866)
 The Contrabandista (1867)
 Thespis (1871)
 Trial by Jury (1875)
 The Zoo (1875)
 The Sorcerer (1877; revised 1884)
 H.M.S. Pinafore (1878)
 The Pirates of Penzance (1879)
 Patience (1881)
 Iolanthe (1882)
 Princess Ida (1884)
 The Mikado (1885)
 Ruddigore (1887)
 The Yeomen of the Guard (1888)
 The Gondoliers (1889)
 Ivanhoe (1891)
 Haddon Hall (1892)
 Utopia, Limited (1893)
 The Chieftain (1894)
 The Grand Duke (1896)
 The Beauty Stone (1898)
 The Rose of Persia (1899)
 The Emerald Isle (1901; completed by Edward German)

Incidental music to plays

 The Tempest (1861) 
 The Merchant of Venice (1871)
 The Merry Wives of Windsor (1874)
 Henry VIII (1877)
 Macbeth (1888)
 Tennyson's The Foresters (1892)
 J. Comyns Carr's King Arthur for Henry Irving (1895)

Ballets
 L'Île Enchantée (1864 ballet)
 Victoria and Merrie England (1897 ballet)

Choral works with orchestra
 The Masque at Kenilworth (1864)
 The Prodigal Son (1869)
 On Shore and Sea (1871)
 Festival Te Deum (1872)
 The Light of the World (1873)
 The Martyr of Antioch (1880)
 Ode for the Opening of the Colonial and Indian Exhibition (1886)
 The Golden Legend (1886)
 Ode for the Laying of the Foundation Stone of The Imperial Institute (1887)
 Te Deum Laudamus (1902; performed posthumously)

Orchestral works
 Overture in D (1858; now lost)
 Overture The Feast of Roses (1860; now lost)
 Procession March (1863)
 Princess of Wales's March (1863)
 Symphony in E, "Irish" (1866)
 Overture in C, "In Memoriam" (1866)
 Concerto for Cello and Orchestra (1866)
 Overture Marmion (1867)
 Overture di Ballo (1870)
 Imperial March (1893)
 The Absent-Minded Beggar March (1899)

Song cycle
 The Window; or, The Song of the Wrens (1871 song cycle)

Church music 
Sullivan's church music includes:
 By the Waters of Babylon, c. 1850, unpublished
 Sing unto the Lord, 1855, unpublished
 Psalm 103, a setting of Psalm 103, 1856, unpublished
 We have heard with our ears
 Dedicated to Sir George Smart, performed at the Chapel Royal in January 1860
 Dedicated to Rev. Thomas Helmore, published by Novello, 1865
 O Love the Lord, dedicated to John Goss, Novello 1864
 Te Deum, Jubilate, Kyrie (in D major), setting of Te Deum, Psalm 100, Kyrie, Novello 1866
 O God, Thou art Worthy, for the wedding of Adrian Hope on 3 June 1867, Novello 1871
 O Taste and See, dedicated to Rev. C. H. Haweis, Novello 1867
 Rejoice in the Lord, for the wedding of Rev. R. Brown-Borthwick on 16 April 1868, Boosey 1868
 Sing, O Heavens, dedicated to Rev. F. C. Byng, Novello 1869
 I Will Worship, dedicated to Rev. F. Gore Ouseley, Boosey 1871
 Two Choruses adapted from Russian Church Music, Novello 1874
 Turn Thee Again
 Mercy and Truth
 I Will Mention the Loving-kindnesses, anthem for Easter dedicated to John Stainer, Novello 1875
 I Will Sing of Thy Power, Novello 1877
 Hearken Unto Me, My People, Novello, 1877
 Turn Thy Face, Novello 1878
 Who is Like unto Thee, dedicated to Walter Parratt, Novello 1883 
 I Will Lay Me Down in Peace, 1868, Novello 1910

 Hymns
 Christmas Carols and Songs
 Sacred part songs

Other works
 Songs and Parlour Ballads
 Part songs
 Chamber Music and Solo Piano

See also
List of W. S. Gilbert dramatic works
Bibliography of W.S. Gilbert

References

Sources
 

 
Gilbert and Sullivan
Sullivan